Golonka may refer to:

 Golonka, the Polish name of a dish of boiled ham hock known in German as Eisbein
 Golonka Love, 2008 album by jazz band The Core (band)
 Golonka, flaki i inne przysmaki, 1995 album by punk rock band Big Cyc
 Arlene Golonka (1936–2021), American actress
 Jozef Golonka (born 1938), Slovak ice hockey player
 Kelsey Golonka, Miss Vermont Teen USA 2017 and Miss Vermont USA 2022
 Taylor Golonka, Boogaloo Shrimp film director